Apterodon ("without winged tooth") is an extinct genus of hyaenodontid mammals that lived from the late Eocene through the middle Oligocene epoch in Africa and Europe. It is closely related to the African Quasiapterodon, and together it, they comprise the hyainailurids subfamily Apterodontinae.

Uniquely among hyaenodonts, species of Apterodon were a semiaquatic, fossorial mammals. They possessed strong forelimbs that were well equipped for digging, compared to those of modern badgers, while the tail, torso and hindlimbs show adaptations similar to those of other aquatic mammals like otters and pinnipeds. The dentition was suited to feed on hard-shelled invertebrate prey, such as crustaceans and shellfish. They probably lived along African coastlines.

Borths and Stevens (2017.) described a new specimen of Apterodon macrognathus (among with other hyaenodonts) and concluded that the dental eruption of secondary dentition occurred much more slowly than in carnivorans.

Phylogeny
The phylogenetic relationships of genus Apterodon are shown in the following cladogram.

See also
 Mammal classification
 Apterodontinae

References

Hyaenodonts
Eocene mammals of Africa
Oligocene mammals of Africa
Oligocene mammals of Europe
Prehistoric placental genera